Elsu (foaled 19 December 1999) is a black New Zealand bred Standardbred pacer who won the Australasian Pacers Grand Circuit Champion and was twice the New Zealand Horse of the Year.

He was sired by Falcon Seelster out of Interchange by New York Motoring.

Racing record
He was trained by Geoff Small and driven by David Butcher.

In 2002/2003, Elsu won the Great Northern Derby, the NZ Yearling Sales Series Open, the New Zealand Trotting Derby and the New South Wales Derby. During his career he also won the 2003 and 2004 Auckland Pacing Cups, the Chariots of Fire, the Noel J Taylor Memorial Mile, the New Zealand Messenger Championship, the A.G. Hunter Cup, the Inter-Dominion Pacing Championship and the City of Auckland Free For All. The 2004/2005 season saw Elsu crowned the Australasian Pacers Grand Circuit Champion, as well as being crowned New Zealand Harness Horse of the Year for the second time.

Elsu was also placed second in the New Zealand Trotting Cup in 2003 and 2004, beaten in both races by Just An Excuse.

Elsu's performance in the 2005 A.G. Hunter Cup was a remarkable effort in the world's richest standing start event, handicapped 20 metres, Elsu sat 3 wide for the last 1,100 metres then powered to the line to easily win. It was later found that he was suffering from leg injuries at the time. His best time for the mile was 1:53.6.

Major race wins
 2003 Auckland Pacing Cup
 2003 New Zealand Trotting Derby
 2004 Auckland Pacing Cup
 2004 Chariots of Fire 
 2005 A G Hunter Cup (Handicap of 20 metres)
 2005 Inter Dominion Pacing Championship

He was retired to stud in 2005 with over two million dollars in earnings. His stud career began well with a full book.

Pedigree

See also

 Harness racing in New Zealand

References

External links
 Register of Standardbred Stallions

Auckland Pacing Cup winners
New Zealand standardbred racehorses
Inter Dominion winners
1999 racehorse births